The Thomas A. Lemoine House in Moreauville, Louisiana is an Arts and Crafts-style house designed by New Orleans architects Favrot & Livaudais and built by builder Thomas A. Lemoine in 1916.

It is located on the outskirts of the small town of Moreauville.  It was deemed significant as a rare work in urban high style by an important architectural firm in rural Avoyelles Parish.  Only one other building in the parish was designed by the firm.  It "has a distinctive Arts and Crafts design which sets it apart from virtually all other period residences in the parish and which bespeaks its high style origin."

As of 1985, the only modification to the house was enclosure of a screened loggia, which was felt did not detract from the historic character of the site.

The house, along with a contemporaneous cistern which is deemed to be a contributing structure, was listed on the National Register of Historic Places in 1985.

References

See also
Thomas A. Lemoine House (Hamburg, Louisiana), another house built in Moreauville by same builder.  It was built in 1886 in Italianate style and was later moved to Hamburg.
National Register of Historic Places listings in Avoyelles Parish, Louisiana

Houses on the National Register of Historic Places in Louisiana
Arts and Crafts architecture in the United States
Houses completed in 1916
Avoyelles Parish, Louisiana